Nytt på nytt ("News Anew", literally "new on new") is a Norwegian version of the British TV comedy panel show Have I Got News for You (created by Hat Trick Productions for the BBC). The programme is a competition between a pair of two-person teams, with one permanent panellist and one guest player on each team.

The aim is for each of the teams to score points by correctly answering questions based on the week's news. In practice, however, the point-scoring element is secondary: although the final scores do get a brief mention at the end of the show, the entertainment chiefly comes from witty remarks made by the panellists and the banter that passes between them.

When the show was first launched, in the spring of 1999, Jon Almaas was the host, and the permanent panellists were Knut Nærum and Anne-Kat. Hærland. In 2016, the show began to be hosted by Bård Tufte Johansen.

The current, permanent panellists, Johan Golden and Pernille Sørensen, both started on the show in 2015.

References

External links
 Nytt på nytt on NRK

Norwegian comedy television series
Norwegian game shows
1990s Norwegian television series
Norwegian television series based on British television series
1999 Norwegian television series debuts